The 1938 Cork Grand Prix was a Grand Prix motor race held at Carrigrohane to the west of Cork city in Ireland on 23 April 1938. The 200-mile race was run over more than 30 laps of a six-mile circuit. It was won by the French driver René Dreyfus in a Delahaye car, with second place going to Prince Bira in a Maserati.

The course ran along the Carrigrohane Straight to Victoria Cross, turned right towards Dennehy's Cross, from there on to Model Farm Road, and west towards eastern outskirts of Ballincollig. This back stretch finished at the Poulavone hairpin bend, before passing "Hell Hole Corner", and back onto the Carrigrohane Straight. The race was watched by an estimated 70,000 spectators, with participants reportedly representing 12 countries.

Classification

References

External links
 "Motor Racing At Cork" (1938) - British Pathé newsreel

Grand Prix race reports
Cork Grand Prix
1938 in Irish sport
Auto races in Ireland
History of Cork (city)